Donaldson Peak, at  above sea level is the eighth-highest peak in the U.S. state of Idaho and the seventh-highest in the Lost River Range. The peak is located in Salmon-Challis National Forest in Custer County.

Named for Charles R. Donaldson (1919-1987), former Chief Justice of the Idaho Supreme Court.

References 

Mountains of Custer County, Idaho
Mountains of Idaho
Salmon-Challis National Forest